The 1852 Louisiana gubernatorial election was the first election to take place under the Louisiana Constitution of 1852. The new constitution shortened the term of Governor Walker and also the term of his successor to make calendar adjustments.

Results
Popular Vote

References

1852
Louisiana
Gubernatorial
December 1852 events